Princess Nine, known in Japan as , is a 26-episode Japanese anime television series and 3 manga volume set.

Synopsis
The series is about the trials of nine girls at the Kisaragi School for Girls who form a baseball team for the purpose of playing on equal footing with boys' teams at the most prestigious high school tournament in Japan, the National High School Baseball Championship. Their aim to qualify for, and ultimately to win, the final rounds of the tournament which is held each year at the Koshien Stadium. They are led by ace pitcher, Ryo Hayakawa, a daughter of a former pitching star in Japan who was banned from Nippon Professional Baseball.

Characters

Main characters
The team (in batting order):

 , Team #4 and second base: A former school dropout, the red-haired thug had to be tricked by Coach Kido into joining the team. She was a star athlete in track and field, and established records for both the 100 m sprint dash and javelin throw. Consequently, she fits in as the leadoff batter on the team. Seira bats and throws right-handed. .
 , Team #3 and first base: Hikaru is the energetic first baseman and switch hitter who was a former softball star recruited to the team. She is originally from Osaka (Kansai) region, which explains her accent. She was the MVP of Junior High School Softball Competition in Kansai. Hikaru throws right-handed. .
 , Team #8 and center field: The only member of the team with actual baseball experience, Koharu played for a boys' team before being found out as a girl. She grew up on the sea as a daughter of a fisherman, and has developed an extremely powerful swing, dubbed "Wave Motion Swing" from her years of fishing. Her batting is so strong that she occasionally hits out of the park home runs. She is originally from Tosa, a small city on the Shikoku island. Koharu bats and throws right-handed. .
 , Team #5 and third base: Izumi is the daughter of the school's chairperson, Keiko Himuro, and was a star tennis player. However, she cast aside her talent in tennis to become Ryo's rival in baseball. Often caustic and difficult, her only goals pertain to her success. Along with Koharu, Izumi is one of the two strongest batters of the team (she is the team's clean up hitter), forming the primary offensive weapons of Kisaragi Girls' Baseball Team. Izumi bats and throws right-handed. .
 , Team #7 and left field: Yuki is highly mysterious and quiet, possibly not even of this world. Never without her "alien" companion, Fifi, whom she keeps with her at all times, Yuki is nevertheless is a superb fielder who is always in the right place at the right time. Like Hikaru, she was also MVP of the Junior High School Softball Competition in Kansai. Yuki bats and throws right-handed. .
 , Team #6 and shortstop: Kanako is an excellent baseball player and is the daughter of the school's principal who is against the baseball team in the first half. She has a kind of geeky attitude, and she wants to be a doctor. But she also likes baseball, and wants to play baseball during her high school years. Kanako was also previously a softball star in junior high, and Hikaru recognizes her from their previous encounters in softball games. Kanako bats and throws right-handed. .
 , Team #9 and right field: Recruited to fill a hole in the lineup, Yoko has very little athletic ability. Yoko is mostly interested in concentrating on a modeling career, but was looking to use the up-and-coming baseball team as a way to stand out from others. She is originally from Okinawa, the southernmost prefecture in Japan, which explains her tanned skin. She left her hometown, claiming it was to get rid of dozens of boys who wanted to be her boyfriend, and set her heart to a career in modeling. Yoko bats and throws right-handed. .
 , Team #2 and catcher: Plucked from the judo team, the imposing but incredibly bashful Mao is the only person who can catch Ryo's pitches. An excellent team member when she can overcome her personal shyness. Mao bats and throws right-handed. .
 , Team #1, pitcher and captain of the Kisaragi Girls' High Baseball Team: Inheriting her father's pitching arm, Ryo has an innate pitching ability. She is a left-handed player just like her father. She originally planned not to go to high school because she wanted to help support her mother at the family's oden shop, but she is recruited to the Kisaragi Girls' High School to be the foundation of the new baseball team. Before playing for Kisaragi, she often played as a relief pitcher for a local sandlot baseball team, the Wildcats. .

All of the team members are excellent athletes and in great physical shape, and this explains why the team becomes such a strong one despite their physical differences. In addition to the nine players, there are two more members:

 : Team manager and part-time cheerleader, Nene is a constant bundle of energy, but knows little of the sport of baseball (learning all she knows from sports manga). A perpetual ditz, Nene is constantly interested in any hobby or ability she can discover. She also sometimes acts as a replacement coach, if Coach Kido is absent or late due to hangovers. .
 : He is a moderately lecherous drunkard who becomes the coach of Kisaragi Girls' High Baseball team. He has connections to both Keiko Himuro and Hidehiko Hayakawa from when they were all younger. In fact, he was Hidehiko's catcher when they were in high school. Despite his very unconvincing and laidback appearance, he is actually quite an observant person, a master strategist and has superior insights and judgements in baseball games. .

Other notable characters
 : A star baseball player at the Kisaragi Boys' High School and son of a wealthy family, he was being groomed as a potential boyfriend and possibly fiancé of Izumi. However, Hiroki has an attraction to the spunky Ryo: he calls her "Ganmo-chan" ("Tofu girl" in the English dub) as it is his favorite part of oden. 
 : Ryo's mother, the late Hidehiko's wife and owner/operator of an Oden shop. Her husband died several years ago and Shino and Ryo run the shop themselves now. Shino is highly supportive of Ryo's dreams to play baseball. 
 : Keiko is the cold and seemingly aloof President of the school and mother to Izumi. Solid in her ambitions, she forgoes seemingly everything to accomplish her plans. Her stated motivation behind the creation of the girls' baseball team is to see the pitching ability Ryo inherited from her father on the mound at Koshien Stadium. 
 : Ryo's late father and Shino's late husband. A left-handed, rising star pitcher in baseball many years ago, but he was banned from playing baseball for life because of a scandal he was caught up in (but had nothing to do with). He won the National High School Baseball Championship at Koshien a long time ago, and during his short stint as a pro baseball player, he won the Japan Series with the Towa Jaguars three times in a row before he was banned from baseball. He is famous for inventing and throwing the legendary Lightning Ball, an extremely powerful pitch which has struck out a lot of professional baseball players. Ryo later rediscovered the Lightning Ball with the hints from coach Kido, and she uses it as her ultimate weapon in her baseball games. 
 : Ryo's best friend since kindergarten, and a total genius in high school. He had a crush on Ryo, but could never express it. At the end of the series, he finds himself falling for Hikaru, and she with him, even receiving his first kiss from her.

Release
The series was produced by Phoenix Entertainment, and aired from April 8 to October 14, 1998 on NHK. The series was initially released by ADV Films in North America, who released it in six VHS and DVD volumes. The show is listed on Animeondvd.com as a recommended series. At Anime Expo 2013, Right Stuf Inc. had announced that they have licensed the series for a 2014 release under their Lucky Penny label. Funimation is streaming the series on their website in partnership with Nozomi.

Episode list

See also
These are titles with a similar theme of women's baseball:
 Cinderella Nine
 Taisho Baseball Girls

References

External links
 

1998 anime television series debuts
ADV Films
Baseball in anime and manga
NHK original programming
Women's baseball
Works about women's sports